Chip of the Flying U is a 1939 American Western film directed by Ralph Staub and starring Johnny Mack Brown. It was produced and distributed by Universal Pictures and is a remake of their silent epic starring Hoot Gibson.

Cast
 Johnny Mack Brown as 'Chip' Bennett
 Bob Baker as 'Dusty'
 Fuzzy Knight as 'Weary'
 Doris Weston as Margaret Whitmore
 Forrest Taylor as J.G. Whitmore
 Anthony Warde as Ed Duncan
 Karl Hackett as Hennessy
 Henry Hall as Banker Wilson
 Claire Whitney as Miss Robinson
 Ferris Taylor as Sheriff
 Cecil Kellogg as Red
 The Texas Rangers as Musicians

References

External links
 Chip of the Flying U at IMDb.com
 

1939 films
1939 Western (genre) films
American Western (genre) films
American black-and-white films
Films directed by Ralph Staub
Universal Pictures films
1930s American films